The patagium (plural: patagia) is a membranous body part that assists an animal in obtaining lift when gliding or flight. The structure is found in extant and extinct groups of flying and gliding animals including bats, birds, some dromaeosaurs, pterosaurs, gliding mammals, some flying lizards, and flying frogs. The patagium that stretches between an animal's hind limbs is called the uropatagium (especially in bats) or the interfemoral membrane.

Bats

In bats, the skin forming the surface of the wing is an extension of the skin of the abdomen that runs to the tip of each digit, uniting the forelimb with the body.

The patagium of a bat has four distinct parts:
Propatagium: the patagium present from the neck to the first digit.
Dactylopatagium: the portion found within the digits.
Plagiopatagium: the portion found between the last digit and the hindlimbs.
Uropatagium: the posterior portion of the flap between the two hindlimbs.

Pterosaurs
In the flying pterosaurs, the patagium was composed of the membrane forming the surface of the wing, supported primarily between the body and the elongated fourth finger.

The patagium of a pterosaur had three distinct parts:
Propatagium: the anterior-most membrane, extending from the shoulder to the wrist. Pterosaurs developed a unique bone to support this membrane, the pteroid.
Brachiopatagium: the main flight surface, stretching from the elongated fourth finger to the hindlimbs.
Uropatagium or cruropatagium: the posterior-most membrane occurring between the two hindlimbs.
A laser-simulated fluorescence scan on Pterodactylus also identified a membranous "fairing" (area conjunctioning the wing with the body at the neck), as opposed to the feathered or fur-composed "fairing" seen in birds and bats respectively.

Gliding mammals

Flying squirrels, sugar gliders, colugos, anomalures and other mammals also have patagia that extend between the limbs; as in bats and pterosaurs, they also possess propatagia and uropatagia. Though the forelimb is not as specialised as in true flyers, the membrane tends to be an equally complex organ, composed of various muscle groups and fibers. Various species have styliform bones to support the membranes, either on the elbow (colugos, anomalures, greater glider, Eomys) or on the wrist (flying squirrels).

Other

In gliding species, such as some lizards and flying frogs, the patagium is the flat parachute-like extension of skin that catches the air, which allows gliding flight.

In birds, the propatagium is the elastic fold of skin extending from the shoulder to the carpal joint, making up the leading edge of the inner wing.  Many authors use the term to describe the fold of skin between the body (behind the shoulder) and the elbow that houses the outer segments of the latissimus dorsi caudalis and triceps scapularis muscles. Similarly the fleshy pad that houses the follicles of the remiges (primary and secondary feathers) caudal to the hand and the ulna is also often referred to as a patagium. The interremigial ligament that connects the bases all the primary and secondary feathers as it passes from the tip of the hand to the elbow is thought to represent the caudal edge of the ancestral form of this patagium.

The scansoriopterygid dinosaurs Yi and Ambopteryx had rather elaborate, superficially bat-like patagia in the forelimbs, unique among dinosaurs. The exact extent isn't clear, but they were extensive and supported by a long styliform bone as in gliding mammals. Other scansoriopterygids might have had similar patagia, based on their long third fingers.

See also
 
 
 
  that uses jumpsuit with webbed sleeves, which mimic the patagia of flying mammals

References

Mammal anatomy
Bird anatomy
Reptile anatomy
Insect anatomy